Taberg is a hamlet in the town of Annsville in Oneida County, New York, United States. Taberg is the town center of Annsville, which was originally named Taberg.

History
Taberg was originally a hamlet named from an iron-mining town in Sweden called Taberg and was situated on the east branch of Fish Creek, near what is now the southeast part of Annsville. It originally contained three churches, viz., Baptist, Methodist and Presbyterian; the first town census population numbered about 350.

In 1809, the Oneida Iron and Glass Company commenced operations, and during the War of 1812-15, was engaged in the manufacturing of shot and shell for the United States Army. After the close of the war, the Company engaged in the manufacturing of hollow ware, until 1865, when the business was discontinued. A large tannery is now located near the site of the old furnace. One other notable place of interest is the Old Taberg Cemetery.

Demographics

Government

Taberg has no mayor and is governed by the Annsville town government. The Annsville town hall, however, is located in Taberg.

References

External links
 Taberg, NY Zipcode Map
 Taberg, NY info at hometownlocator.com

Utica–Rome metropolitan area
Hamlets in Oneida County, New York
Hamlets in New York (state)